Qinghe District was a former district of Huai'an, Jiangsu province, China. In October 2016, Qinghe and Qingpu districts were merged to form Qingjiangpu District.

References

Former districts of China
Huai'an
2016 disestablishments in China